Rosamund is a feminine given name.

It may also refer to:

Matthew Rosamund (1823-1866), soldier and recipient of the Victoria Cross
540 Rosamunde, an asteroid
An opera by Thomas Augustine Arne
Rosamund (Tahlequah, Oklahoma), listed on the NRHP in Cherokee County, Oklahoma

See also
Rosamunde (disambiguation)
Rosamond (disambiguation)
Rosmonda, a tragicomedy by Carlo Goldoni